Sarandon may relate to:

Susan Sarandon, actress
Chris Sarandon, actor
Sarandon (band), English rock group